The 2022 Powys Council election took place on 5 May 2022 to elect 68 members to Powys County Council. On the same day, elections were held to the other 21 local authorities and to community councils in Wales as part of the 2022 Welsh local elections. The previous Powys all-council election took place in May 2017 and future elections will take place every five years.

Results

Ward results (Brecknockshire)

Aber Craf and Ystradgynlais (2 seats)

Brecon East (2 seats)

Brecon West (2 seats)

Bronllys and Felin-Fach

Builth

Crickhowell with Cwmdu and Tretower (2 seats)

Cwm-twrch

Gwernyfed

Hay

Llanafanfawr with Garth

Llangors with Bwlch

Llangattock and Llangynidr

Llanwrtyd Wells

Maescar and Llywel

Talgarth

Talybont-on-Usk

Tawe Uchaf

Ynyscedwyn

Yscir with Honddu Isaf and Llanddew

Ward results (Montgomeryshire)

Banwy, Llanfihangel and Llanwddyn

Berriew and Castle Caereinion

Caersws

Churchstoke

Dolforwyn

Forden and Montgomery

Glantwymyn

Guilsfield

Kerry

Llanbrynmair

Llandinam with Dolfor

Llandrinio

Llandysilio

Llanfair Caereinion and Llanerfyl

Llanfyllin

Llangyniew and Meifod

Llanidloes (2 seats)

Llanrhaeadr-ym-Mochant and Llansilin

Llansantffraid

Machynlleth

Newtown Central and South (2 seats)

Newtown East

Newtown North

Newtown West

Rhiwcynon

Trelystan and Trewern

Welshpool Castle

Welshpool Gungrog

Welshpool Llanerchyddol

Ward results (Radnorshire)

Disserth and Trecoed with Newbridge

Glasbury

Ithon Valley

Knighton with Beguildy (2 seats)

Llandrindod North

Llandrindod South (2 seats)

Llanelwedd

Llangunllo with Norton

Llanyre with Nantmel

Old Radnor

Presteigne

Rhayader

Aftermath
On 25 May 2022, Labour and the Liberal Democrats announced that they had agreed a deal to run the council, meaning Powys would be led by party political groups for the first time since its creation.

References

Powys
Powys County Council elections